The 2013 Island Games in Bermuda will be the seventh edition in which a football (soccer) tournament is played at the multi-games competition.

Participants

Group Phase

Final stage

Semi-final match

Final

See also
Men's Football at the 2013 Island Games

References

2013
Women
Island